Conanicut Island is the second-largest island in Narragansett Bay in the American state of Rhode Island. It is connected on the east to Newport on Aquidneck Island via the Claiborne Pell Bridge, commonly known as the Newport Bridge, and on the west to North Kingstown on the mainland via the Jamestown-Verrazano Bridge. The town of Jamestown comprises the entire island.

History
Conanicut Island was a seasonal home to many American Indians. The largest Indian cemetery in New England is located on the island, and artifacts have been recovered from a site near the elementary school. The island is named for Chief Canonicus of the Narragansett tribe who maintained his royal residence on the island.

In 1636 or 1637, Dutch fur traders paid to use the island of Quentenis as a base for their activities. This island is located just west of Conanicut; it is now known as Dutch Island and is part of Jamestown. In 1638, the English colonists made arrangements to use Conanicut Island for grazing sheep, and Canonicus was one of the Narragansett sachems who gave consent. They referred to the island in his honor, and the Jamestown seal today includes the figure of a sheep. Conanicut Island was a part of the island territory included in a commission which the Council of State of England granted to William Coddington in 1651.

In 1657, a consortium of about 100 buyers purchased Conanicut, Dutch, and Gould Islands. They divided Conanicut into roughly a dozen large plots and reserved Dutch Island and parts of Conanicut for common use. Benedict Arnold was one of the purchasers, and he became governor of the colony of Rhode Island the same year. (Arnold was the great-grandfather of the Revolutionary War traitor.)

The Indians and colonists lived side-by-side in relative peace for almost four decades. Conflicts eventually occurred in a number of places in southern New England, leading to what is known as King Philip's War. Life in the region was dominated by the colonists after 1676, although Conanicut Island remained a haven for many Indians.

In 1725, a ferry was established between the island and Newport. Another ferry was established to South Kingstown in 1748.

Notable residents 
 Captain Daniel Fones
 Lauren Buckley

References

Islands of Narragansett Bay
Islands of Newport County, Rhode Island
Islands of Rhode Island
Jamestown, Rhode Island